The Mararit are an ethnic group of Chad and Darfur, Sudan. Most members of this ethnic group are Muslims.  They speak the Mararit language, which is a Nilo-Saharan language. The population of the group is estimated at 32,000.

References

Ethnic groups in Sudan
Ethnic groups in Chad